Mr. Sunshine  may refer to:

Mr. Sunshine (1986 TV series), a 1986 American sitcom series broadcast by ABC
Mr. Sunshine (2011 TV series), a 2011 American sitcom series broadcast by ABC starring Matthew Perry
Mr. Sunshine (South Korean TV series), a 2018 South Korean television series